Derek Dodson (born November 3, 1998) is an American professional soccer player who plays as a wing-back for Charleston Battery in the USL Championship.

Early years 
Dodson was born in Aurora, Illinois. Growing up he was a three-year starter and one-year captain during his five seasons with the Sockers FC academy. The club qualified for the playoffs in all five years and Dodson was named to the 2017 USSDA Central Conference Best XI.

Georgetown Hoyas 
Dodson played college soccer at Georgetown University, scoring 32 goals in 72 appearances for the Georgetown Hoyas between 2017 and 2021.

He appeared in all 20 games as a freshman but was limited to seven starts. Despite this he led the Hoyas in scoring with 10 goals, including three game-winners, and was named Big East Freshman of the Year.

Having secured a starting role as a sophomore, Dodson was a two-time First Team All-Big East selection in 2018 and 2019 and also earned United Soccer Coaches All-America third team honors in 2019. During Georgetown's College Cup winning season in 2019, Dodson scored a career-high 11 goals as Georgetown won all three competitions they played in: defending the Big East regular season title, winning a third consecutive Big East tournament, and claiming the first National Championship in program history. Dodson scored an 81st minute go-ahead goal in the final before fellow future Orlando City draftee Daryl Dike equalized five minutes later to take the game into overtime with the scores level at 3–3. Georgetown ultimately won in a penalty shoot-out.

After the postponement of the 2020 fall season until spring 2021 due to the COVID-19 pandemic, Dodson elected to return as a senior despite having been drafted by Orlando City in January 2021. He made a further sevens appearances for the Hoyas until his departure for Orlando in April having helped the team top the conference spring series standings. He was named to the Big East All-Conference first team at the end of regular season awards.

While at college, Dodson appeared for Premier Development League side North County United in 2018, scoring two goals in six appearances.

Club career

Orlando City 
On January 21, 2021, Dodson was selected in the first round (8th overall) of the 2021 MLS SuperDraft by Orlando City. Orlando had traded $100,000 in general allocation money to Portland Timbers earlier in the day to acquire the pick. Dodson missed preseason camp, electing to return to Georgetown to play during the delayed college season, but was eventually signed by the team on April 28 to a one-year contract with three separate option years.

Hartford Athletic 
Having not yet featured in a matchday squad for Orlando City, Dodson was loaned to USL Championship side Hartford Athletic on July 9, 2021. He made his professional debut the following day as a 42nd-minute substitute replacing Richie Schlentz against New York Red Bulls II and scored in the 86th minute as Hartford came from two goals down to tie 2–2 in stoppage time. He scored again three days later, the only goal in a 1–0 win over Tampa Bay Rowdies. He scored five goals in 22 appearances as Hartford finished fifth in the Atlantic Division. Dodson had his contract option declined by Orlando City at the end of the 2021 season.

Memphis 901 
On February 18, 2022, Dodson signed with USL Championship side Memphis 901 ahead of their upcoming 2022 season.

Charleston Battery
On December 15, 2022, it was announced Dodson had moved to USL Championship side Charleston Battery to reunite with recently appointed head coach Ben Pirmann, who had coached Memphis for the 2022 season.

Personal life 
Two of Dodson's older siblings also played college soccer. His brother, Ryan, played for the North Carolina Tar Heels (2011) and Denver Pioneers (2012–14). His sister, Kristen, played for the Auburn Tigers (2014–17).

Career statistics

College

Club

Honors

College 
Georgetown Hoyas
Big East Conference regular season: 2018, 2019
Big East Conference Tournament: 2017, 2018, 2019
NCAA Division I Men's Soccer Tournament: 2019

Individual 
Big East Freshman of the Year: 2017

References

External links 
 Derek Dodson at Georgetown Hoyas
 Derek Dodson at Orlando City SC
 

1998 births
Living people
People from Aurora, Illinois
Soccer players from Illinois
Sportspeople from Aurora, Illinois
American soccer players
Association football forwards
Georgetown Hoyas men's soccer players
Treasure Coast Tritons players
Orlando City SC draft picks
Orlando City SC players
Hartford Athletic players
Memphis 901 FC players
Charleston Battery players
USL League Two players
USL Championship players